Bertholdia myosticta is a moth of the family Erebidae. It was described by Herbert Druce in 1897. It is found in Mexico, Costa Rica and Venezuela.

References

Phaegopterina
Moths described in 1897